Elisa Gabbai was an Israeli singer who became famous in the late 1960s. She interpreted songs in various languages, mainly in German but also in Hebrew. Her general genre is said to be Schlager.

Biography
Elisa Gabbai's mother was an opera singer. Her father died very early in her life. She had her first small musical accomplishments in her homeland. In 1962, she shined in Israel with her first album containing 17 Israeli folk songs. In 1965, she became acknowledged as the singer of Switzerland, due to her extraordinary nightclub shows. There a music agent from Berlin heard her one night, with whom she signed a contract.

Discography
 Songs of Old and New Tel Aviv (1953)
 A: Winter in Canada – B: Nach Tahiti, Hawaii und Jamaica (1966)
 A: Vorbei sind die Tränen – B: Was bin ich ohne dich (1966)
 A: Nur wenn du bei mir bist – B: Die Liebe ist ein Lied (1966)
 A: Zwei wie wir – B: Berge und Täler (1967)
 A: Mama – B: Meine kleine Minka (1967)
 A: Ein langes Leben lang – B: Tam-Tam-Tambourin (1967)
 A: Gar kein Problem – B: Laß die Träume (1968)
 במקצבים חדשים / New Rhythms (1968)

References

External links
 Short biography and discography Dead link as of August 23, 2012
 
 

1933 births
2010 deaths
20th-century Israeli women singers